The Target Maui Pro 2015 was an event of the Association of Surfing Professionals for the 2015 ASP World Tour, held from 21 November 2015 to 4 December 2015 at Honolua, Hawaii, United States.

The tournament was won by Carissa Moore (Hawaii), who beat Sally Fitzgibbons (Australia) in the final.

Round 1

Round 2

Round 3

Round 4

Quarter finals

Semi finals

Final

References

External links
Results on worldsurfleague.com

2015 World Surf League
2015 in sports in Hawaii
Surfing competitions in Hawaii
Sports in Maui
Women's surfing
November 2015 sports events in Oceania
December 2015 sports events in Oceania